Emilio Merchán Alonso (born 29 February 1976 in Zamora) is a Spanish sprint and marathon canoeist who has competed since the mid-1990s. He won a gold medal in the K-2 1000 m event at the 2009 ICF Canoe Sprint World Championships in Dartmouth.

Merchán also competed in two Summer Olympics, earning his best finish of fifth in the K-4 1000 m event at Atlanta in 1996.

References
 Canoe09.ca profile
 
 Article in La Opinion de Zamora newspaper

1976 births
Living people
Spanish male canoeists
Olympic canoeists of Spain
Canoeists at the 1996 Summer Olympics
Canoeists at the 2000 Summer Olympics
ICF Canoe Sprint World Championships medalists in kayak
Medalists at the ICF Canoe Marathon World Championships
20th-century Spanish people